Santiago Ezequiel Navarro (born 6 July 2001) is an Argentine professional footballer who plays as a centre-back for Temperley, on loan from Huracán.

Club career
On 24 July 2019, Navarro signed his first professional contract with Huracán. Navarro made his professional debut with Huracán in a 2-0 Argentine Primera División loss to Aldosivi on 15 February 2020. On 2 June 2022, Navarro joined Temperley on loan until the end of 2023.

References

External links

2001 births
Living people
People from La Matanza Partido
Argentine footballers
Association football defenders
Argentine Primera División players
Club Atlético Huracán footballers
Club Atlético Temperley footballers
Sportspeople from Buenos Aires Province